Mikael Rahm, (born 15 May 1957 in Östersund) is a Swedish actor. Internationally, he is best known for his parts in the movies As It Is in Heaven and Let the Right One In.

Filmography

References

1957 births
Living people
Swedish male actors